Elvis Augusto Andrus Torres (born August 26, 1988) is a Venezuelan-American professional baseball shortstop for the Chicago White Sox of Major League Baseball (MLB). He has previously played in MLB for the Texas Rangers and Oakland Athletics.

Entering , he was rated by Baseball America as the No. 2 prospect in the Atlanta Braves organization. Traded to Texas, Andrus earned the Texas Rangers starting shortstop job in 2009 at the age of 20. He is a two-time All Star.

Early life
Andrus was born in Maracay, Venezuela, the son of Emilio and Elvia Andrus. Emilio Andrus was a university professor; he died when Elvis was seven years old. He has two older brothers, Erold and Erikson. Some Venezuelan families name their children after famous non-Venezuelan people, but Andrus said that he is not sure whether he was named after Elvis Presley. Andrus said, "I asked my mother a lot of times, but she never told me. Maybe my dad liked Elvis Presley. I'm not sure about that."

Career

Minor leagues

At the age of 16, Andrus was signed by the Atlanta Braves and received a signing bonus of more than $500,000. He started the 2005 season with the Orlando Braves of the Gulf Coast League, and was promoted to Danville late in the season. He spent 2006 with Class-A Rome, being named to the South Atlantic League All-Star team.

In 2007, Andrus joined the Class A Myrtle Beach Pelicans of the Carolina League. During the season, he was selected to the All-Star Futures Game and was selected again for the showcase in 2008.

On July 31, 2007, Andrus, Jarrod Saltalamacchia and three minor league pitchers (Matt Harrison, Neftalí Feliz and Beau Jones) were traded from the Braves to the Rangers for Mark Teixeira and Ron Mahay.

Texas Rangers (2009–2020)

With Rangers shortstop Michael Young agreeing to move to third base in 2009, Andrus earned the starting job on Opening Day. He was the second-youngest player in the American League at the time.  As Andrus was only 20 years old, Texas signed veteran shortstop Omar Vizquel for insurance. Andrus stole his 20th base on July 28, 2009, in his rookie season. Andrus was the 10th player in major league history to steal 20 bases under the age of 21. The last player to do that was his then-teammate Andruw Jones, who had accomplished the feat in 1997 with the Atlanta Braves. Andrus finished the 2009 season hitting .267 with 6 home runs and 33 stolen bases, finishing second in American League Rookie of the Year voting.

Andrus was named to the 2010 American League All-Star team as a reserve shortstop. In 2010, he batted .265, without any home runs.  He led the AL in sacrifice hits (17), was 2nd in caught stealing (15), and 9th in stolen bases (32).

In 2011, Andrus batted .279, with 5 home runs.  He was 3rd in the American League in sacrifice hits (16), 4th in caught stealing (12), and 5th in stolen bases (37).  On defense, he led all AL shortstops in errors, with 25, and was 2nd among league shortstops in putouts (245) and 3rd in assists (407). In 2012, Andrus earned his second All-Star selection, batting .286 while leading the American League in sacrifice hits with 17.

Before Opening Day of 2013, Andrus signed an eight-year, $120 million extension. On September 14, he stole his 40th stolen base of the season against the Oakland Athletics, stealing second base from Bartolo Colón. Andrus later surpassed Ian Kinsler for the Texas Rangers all-time leader in stolen bases with 175. He finished the year again leading the American League in sacrifice hits (16) while batting .271 and scoring 91 runs.

Andrus began the 2014 season with an 11-game hitting streak that ultimately ended with an early ejection April 13. On June 8, Andrus had a 39-game hitting streak against the Cleveland Indians snapped as he went 0 for 4. That game marked the first time in his career where he did not get a hit against the Indians. Only Vladimir Guerrero had a longer streak against a team (with 44, against Texas). Andrus stole his 180th career stolen base against the Seattle Mariners but led the American League in caught stealing with 15, batting .263 for the season.

Andrus finished 2015 with career lows in batting average (.258), OBP (.309), and sacrifice hits, while posting a career-best seven home runs and stealing 25 bags for the AL West champion Rangers. On defense, he led the major leagues in assists, with 516. He batted .182 in the Rangers' ALDS series against Toronto and made two of the team's three errors in the pivotal seventh inning of Game 5, won by the Blue Jays. In 2016, hit .302 with eight home runs and 69 RBIs. 

He continued the following season, in 2017, to post a career offensive season, hitting .297 with 20 home runs and 88 RBIs and 25 steals in 158 games. On defense, he led the major leagues in assists, with 490.

On April 11, 2018, Andrus was hit by a pitch on his right arm and left the game. X-rays and CT scans tested positive that Andrus had suffered a fractured right elbow. As a result, he was placed on the injured list for the first time of his Major League career. No surgery was required, but to keep out of baseball activity for 6-8 weeks. He was activated on June 18 from the injured list. Andrus finished 2018 hitting .256/.308/.367/.675 with 6 home runs and 33 RBI.

Andrus hit .275/.313/.393/.707 with 12 home runs, 72 RBIs, and 31 stolen bases in 2019. He tied for the AL lead with 10 sacrifice flies.

In 2020, Andrus batted .194/.252/.330 with three home runs and seven RBIs in 103 at bats, and his .969 fielding percentage was his lowest in 10 seasons.

Oakland Athletics (2021–2022)
On February 6, 2021, Andrus and Aramis Garcia were traded to the Oakland Athletics for Khris Davis, Jonah Heim, and Dane Acker. In his first year in Oakland, Andrus batted .243/.294/.320 with 3 home runs, 37 RBIs and 12 stolen bases in 146 games. On August 17, 2022, Andrus was released by the Athletics.

Chicago White Sox (2022-present)
The Chicago White Sox signed Andrus to a major league contract on August 19, 2022.

On February 20, 2023, Andrus signed a one-year contract to return to the White Sox.

Personal life

Andrus is a Christian. In 2012, Andrus donated $12,500 to OurCalling, a Christian charity that helps homeless people in Dallas County.

Andrus married girlfriend Cori Febles in a ceremony at his home on June 1, 2017. The couple welcomed their first child, Elvis Emilio, on July 6, 2017. On November 28, 2018, they welcomed their second child, a girl, named Lucia Alessandra. For the 2019 season, Andrus adopted "Baby Shark" as his walk-up song because it reminded him of his children. 

Two of Andrus' brothers remain in Venezuela. Andrus voiced concern about his home country during civil unrest in early 2014. "As a human being, you always get angry when you see what's happening with the military back home doing stuff to the civils, and to the students, and that's what really gets me angry. I'm not a political guy, but I just hate when you see somebody just walking and trying to say something get hit by police, or get hit by any military from the country that's supposed to defend the country instead of shoot him or hit him", he said.

Andrus' older brother Erold Andrus played in the independent leagues in 2009 and 2010 as an outfielder. He has played in the organizations of several MLB teams. During spring training of 2011, though Erold was in minor league camp, he got the opportunity to play in a Rangers spring training game, the first time that Erold and Elvis played together in the United States.

On July 26, 2019, Andrus became a naturalized US citizen.

See also

 List of Major League Baseball career putouts as a shortstop leaders
 List of Major League Baseball players from Venezuela

References

External links

 Minor League Baseball statistics
The Scouting Book

1988 births
Living people
American League All-Stars
American sportspeople of Venezuelan descent
Bakersfield Blaze players
Chicago White Sox players
Danville Braves players
Frisco RoughRiders players
Gulf Coast Braves players
Major League Baseball players from Venezuela
Venezuelan expatriate baseball players in the United States
Major League Baseball shortstops
Myrtle Beach Pelicans players
Navegantes del Magallanes players
Oakland Athletics players
Rome Braves players
Sportspeople from Maracay
Surprise Rafters players
Texas Rangers players
Venezuelan emigrants to the United States
World Baseball Classic players of Venezuela
2013 World Baseball Classic players
Naturalized citizens of the United States